SharpTone Records is an American independent record label started on September 11, 2013. The label was founded by Nuclear Blast CEO Markus Staiger and former vice president of Sumerian Records Shawn Keith. The label's roster includes an amalgamation of metalcore and rock bands: Don Broco, Loathe, Miss May I, We Came as Romans, Of Mice & Men, Holding Absence, Story of the Year, August Burns Red, Polaris, Currents, Crystal Lake, Emmure, and Alt.

History

Conception and first releases (2013) 
The record label was started by Markus Staiger, the current CEO of Nuclear Blast Records and Shawn Keith, the former vice president of Sumerian Records. The label has been described as an offshoot label of Nuclear Blast which primarily focuses on rock and alternative music, similar to Arising Empire. Arising Empire focuses on metalcore and punk bands. In an interview, Keith spoke about the label: "Developing this label has been very exciting for me. The opportunity to partner and cultivate new and established artists working toward broadening their global potential is thrilling. SharpTone will continue to diversify and evolve as a brand for music fans to truly identify with. We are not just another record label. We are a new-music company, allowing artists to be as creative and passionate as they choose to be."

The record label was first hinted at on June 23, 2016, when the several bands shared a mysterious teaser image reading "A New Era of Music Begins..." on their social media. These bands included Attila, Don Broco, Loathe, Miss May I and We Came as Romans. The following day, the former mentioned bands, plus rock band Word War Me, were all confirmed to be members of the newly established independent music label that came to be known as SharpTone Records. The first release of the label would be a re-issue of the debut EP Prepare Consume Proceed by UK metal band Loathe less than a month later, but the labels first studio album release would be Attila's sixth album titled Chaos, released November 4 the same year. Other later releases for the year included the American release of Don Broco's Automatic, and a release of Craig Owens new side project, badXchannels, who was also signed later in 2016, with the EP being named WHYDFML. Other artists who were also labelled in late 2016 included Emmure and Widowmaker.

Releases and signings (2017–present) 
The label's roster would increase from nine bands in 2016 to seventeen acts by the end of 2017. They released 12 studio albums from bands including Emmure's Look at Yourself, Loathe's The Cold Sun, While She Sleeps' You Are We, and Miss May I's Shadows Inside to name a few. In 2018, along with signing four new bands including Bleeding Through, the label's first band to move away from the label, Attila, said they wanted absolute creative freedom. That was their reason for going solo without the help of any record label. In 2018 the label issued Don Broco's Technology, Sink the Ship's Persevere, and Bleeding Through's Love Will Kill All among others.

Music

The record label primarily focuses on different subgenres within rock music, more specifically the post-hardcore and progressive metalcore side of rock. Early signings included Attila, Emmure, Currents, and Loathe.

Roster

Current artists

Former artists

Releases

References

External links
 

American independent record labels
Heavy metal record labels